Oleksandr Volodymyrovych Poklonskyi (born 22 January 1975) is a retired Ukrainian professional footballer and current manager of VPK-Ahro Shevchenkivka.

References

External links
 

1975 births
Living people
Footballers from Dnipro
Ukrainian footballers
Ukrainian expatriate footballers
Ukraine international footballers
Ukrainian Premier League players
Ukrainian First League players
Ukrainian Second League players
FC Prometei Dniprodzerzhynsk players
FC Krystal Kherson players
FC Vorskla Poltava players
FC Podillya Khmelnytskyi players
FC Dnipro players
FC Dnipro-2 Dnipropetrovsk players
FC Dnipro-3 Dnipropetrovsk players
SC Tavriya Simferopol players
FC Kryvbas Kryvyi Rih players
FC Zorya Luhansk players
FC CSKA Kyiv players
FC Naftovyk-Ukrnafta Okhtyrka players
Expatriate footballers in Azerbaijan
Expatriate footballers in Kazakhstan
Simurq PIK players
Ukrainian football managers
FC Dnipro managers
FC Nikopol managers
FC VPK-Ahro Shevchenkivka managers
Ukrainian Second League managers
Association football defenders
Ukrainian expatriate sportspeople in Azerbaijan
Ukrainian expatriate sportspeople in Kazakhstan